Pinocetus is an extinct genus of baleen whale, belonging to the family Cetotheriidae.

References 

Miocene cetaceans
Prehistoric cetacean genera
Miocene mammals of Europe